Pueblo Nuevo is an administrative neighborhood (barrio) of Madrid belonging to the district of Ciudad Lineal.

As of 1 March 2020, it has a population of 63,930.

References 

Wards of Madrid
Ciudad Lineal